Carolina Lüthi (born 11 February 1972) is a Swiss rower. She competed at the 2000 Summer Olympics and the 2004 Summer Olympics.

References

External links
 

1972 births
Living people
Swiss female rowers
Olympic rowers of Switzerland
Rowers at the 2000 Summer Olympics
Rowers at the 2004 Summer Olympics
Sportspeople from Lucerne